Noel Keith Miller (1 July 1913 – 26 November 2007) was an Australian cricketer. He played one first-class match for New South Wales in 1935/36.

See also
 List of New South Wales representative cricketers

References

External links
 

1913 births
2007 deaths
Australian cricketers
New South Wales cricketers
People from the Central Coast (New South Wales)
Cricketers from New South Wales